Coleen Seng (born February 8, 1936) is a politician, who served as the 50th mayor of Lincoln, Nebraska. A member of the Democratic Party, she served as mayor from May 19, 2003 to May 19, 2007. She is best known for seeking payment for $32,000 worth of security expenses, incurred during the 2004 fundraising visit of Dick Cheney.

Political career 
Seng was elected in 2003, beating Republican city councilman Glenn Friendt. Seng received fewer votes than Friendt in the April primary, but due to a strong field campaign rebounded and beat him in the May general election. During her term she had blocked a construction of a Walmart, focused on fixing the main streets, saw the passage of a public smoking ban and  proposed a ban on concealed weapons. She was a member of the Mayors Against Illegal Guns Coalition, a bi-partisan group with a stated goal of "making the public safer by getting illegal guns off the streets." The Coalition is co-chaired by Boston Mayor Thomas Menino and New York City Mayor Michael Bloomberg.

On July 26, 2006 the city council killed a proposal (06-107) submitted by Seng to ban concealed guns within the city limits of Lincoln. At a future council meeting she intends to propose a prohibition for concealed Right-to-Carry for Nebraska permit holders by reclassifying certain types of offenses within the city limits.

On September 7, 2006, Seng announced that she would not run for re-election. State Senator Chris Beutler, who left the Legislature because of term limits, was the only candidate for the Democratic primary. Republican city councilman, Ken Svoboda, announced his candidacy on September 27, 2006.

Dick Cheney incident
Seng sought payment for $32,000 worth of security expenses, incurred during the June 17, 2004 fundraising visit of Dick Cheney in support of Republican Party 1st district congressional candidate Jeff Fortenberry. The city provided security through several street closings, extra law enforcement, as well as medical personnel.

Cheney was born in Lincoln and lived there for the first several years of his life. During the visit, he surprised the current resident of the home he grew up in by stopping by for about an hour, which was part of the increased security cost of his visit.

Republicans argued that Seng, a Democrat, was merely trying to stir up political turmoil, and that the mayor of Omaha sought no such reimbursement following a visit from President George W. Bush in 2003. Fortenberry, however, reimbursed the federal government for use of Air Force Two during the fundraising stop, pointing to a possible precedent for such repayment.

External links
Will Seng run again?
 Lincoln, Nebraska Mayor Working On Another Anti-Gun Proposal!

References

Mayors of Lincoln, Nebraska
Nebraska Democrats
Nebraska Wesleyan University alumni
1936 births
Living people
Women mayors of places in Nebraska
21st-century American women politicians
Politicians from Council Bluffs, Iowa
21st-century American politicians